The 2018 Ricoh Women's British Open was played from 2–5 August in England at Royal Lytham & St Annes Golf Club Golf Links in Lancashire. It was the 43rd Women's British Open, the 18th as a major championship on the LPGA Tour, and the fifth at Royal Lytham & St Annes Golf Club.

Georgia Hall of England shot a final round 67 (−5) to win by two strokes over runner-up Pornanong Phatlum, the 54-hole leader. It was her first major title and she was the first British winner since Catriona Matthew in 2009. It was also the first win on tour (LPGA Tour or Ladies European Tour) for the 22-year-old Hall, the first English winner of the championship in 14 years.

The event was televised by Golf Channel and NBC Sports in the United States and Sky Sports in the United Kingdom.

Course layout

Previous lengths of the course for the Women's British Open (since 2001):
 2009: , par 72 
 2006: , par 72 
 2003: , par 72

Field
The field was 144 players, and most earned exemptions based on past performance on the Ladies European Tour, the LPGA Tour, previous major championships, or with a high ranking in the Women's World Golf Rankings. The rest of the field earned entry by successfully competing in qualifying tournaments open to any female golfer, professional or amateur, with a low handicap.

There were 18 exemption categories for the 2018 Women's British Open:

1. The top 15 finishers (and ties) from the 2017 Women's British Open.

Jodi Ewart Shadoff, Shanshan Feng (10), Georgia Hall (9), In-Kyung Kim (10,11), Kim Hyo-joo (10,12), Caroline Masson, Anna Nordqvist (10,12), Inbee Park (2,10,11,12), Lizette Salas (10), Jenny Shin, Michelle Wie (2,10,12), Angel Yin

Stacy Lewis, Ai Suzuki (9,10), and Lexi Thompson (10,12) did not play.

2. The top 10 Ladies European Tour members in the Women's World Golf Rankings not exempt under (1).

Aditi Ashok (5), Carlota Ciganda (5,10), Sandra Gal (5), Charley Hull (5,10), Pernilla Lindberg (5,8,12), Azahara Muñoz (5), Su-Hyun Oh (5), Madelene Sagström (5)

Karine Icher and  Suzann Pettersen (12) did not play.

3. The top 30 LPGA Tour members in the Women's World Golf Rankings not exempt under (1) as of 3 July.

Marina Alex, Brittany Altomare, Chella Choi, Chun In-gee (10,12), Jacqui Concolino, Lindy Duncan, Austin Ernst, Nasa Hataoka (8,10), Brooke Henderson (8,10,12), Wei-Ling Hsu, Mi Jung Hur, Ji Eun-hee (8,10), Ariya Jutanugarn (8,10,11,12), Moriya Jutanugarn (8,10), Danielle Kang (10,12), Cristie Kerr (10), Kim Sei-young (8,10), Katherine Kirk, Ko Jin-young (8,10), Lydia Ko (8,10,12), Jessica Korda (8,10), Nelly Korda, Lee Mi-hyang, Minjee Lee (8,10), Mirim Lee, Brittany Lincicome (8,12), Park Sung-hyun (8,10,12), Ryu So-yeon (8,10,12), Jennifer Song, Amy Yang (10)

4. The top 25 on the current LET money list not exempt under (1) or (2) as of 3 July.

Rebecca Artis, Silvia Bañón, Céline Boutier (5,8), Ashleigh Buhai (5,8), Katie Burnett, Lynn Carlsson, Holly Clyburn, Olivia Cowan, Casey Danielson, Julia Engström, Jenny Haglund (8), Caroline Hedwall, Kylie Henry, Noemí Jiménez Martín, Valdis Thora Jonsdottir, Sarah Kemp, Karolin Lampert, Camilla Lennarth, Lin Xiyu, Meghan MacLaren (8), Florentyna Parker, Marianne Skarpnord, Klára Spilková, Anne Van Dam, Astrid Vayson de Pradenne (8), Christine Wolf

5. The top 40 on the current LPGA Tour money list not exempt under (1) or (3) as of 3 July.

Nicole Broch Larsen, Laura Davies, Hannah Green, Jaye Marie Green, Caroline Inglis, Megan Khang, Bronte Law, Lee Jeong-eun, Yu Liu, Mo Martin (11), Ally McDonald, Wichanee Meechai, Amy Olson, Ryann O'Toole, Annie Park (8), Park Hee-young, Jane Park, Pornanong Phatlum, Sherman Santiwiwatthanaphong, Sarah Jane Smith, Mariah Stackhouse, Angela Stanford, Emma Talley, Kris Tamulis, Ayako Uehara, Mariajo Uribe, Sakura Yokomine

6. The top five on the current LPGA of Japan Tour (JLPGA) money list not exempt under (1), (2), (3), or (12) as of 3 July.

Ahn Sun-ju, Mamiko Higa, Misuzu Narita, Eri Okayama, Phoebe Yao

Jiyai Shin (8,10,11) and Erika Kikuchi did not play.

7. The top two on the current LPGA of Korea Tour (KLPGA) money list not exempt under (1), (2), (3), or (6) as of 3 July.

Choi Hye-jin (10)

Oh Ji-hyun did not play.

8. Winners of any recognised LET or LPGA Tour events in the calendar year 2018.

Kanyalak Preedasuttijit, Thidapa Suwannapura

Jang Ha-na did not play

9. Winners of the 2017 LET, LPGA, JLPGA and KLPGA money lists.

Lee Jeong-eun (10) did not play.

10. The top 30 in the Women's World Golf Rankings, not exempt above as of 3 July.

11. Winners of the Women's British Open, under age 60, provided they are still active.

Catriona Matthew, Yani Tseng, Karrie Webb

12. Winners of the last five editions of the U.S. Women's Open, ANA Inspiration, and Women's PGA Championship, and The Evian Championship.

Brittany Lang

13. Winner of the 2017 Japan LPGA Tour Championship Ricoh Cup.

Teresa Lu

14. The leading five LPGA Tour members in the 2018 Marathon Classic who have entered the Championship and who are not otherwise exempt.

Daniela Darquea, Mina Harigae, Céline Herbin, Melissa Reid

Sandra Changkija did not play.

15. The leading three LET members in the 2018 Aberdeen Asset Management Ladies Scottish Open, who have entered the Championship and who are not otherwise exempt.

Nuria Iturrioz, Lee-Anne Pace, Cheyenne Woods

16. The 2018 Women's Amateur Asia-Pacific champion, 2018 British Ladies Amateur champion, 2017 U.S. Women's Amateur champion, 2017 European Ladies Amateur Championship champion, winner or next available player in the 2017 GB&I Order of Merit, and the Mark H. McCormack Medal holder provided they are still amateurs at the time of the Championship.

Leonie Harm, Agathe Laisné, Atthaya Thitikul

Sophia Schubert did not play.
Leona Maguire forfeited her exemption as Mark H. McCormack Medal holder by turning professional.

17. Any players granted special exemptions from qualifying by the Championship Committee.

Nanna Koerstz Madsen

18. Balance of the 90 LPGA Tour members.

None

Qualifiers: 
Laetitia Beck, Tonje Daffinrud, Ludovica Farina (a), Cloe Frankish, Rachael Goodall, Linn Grant (a), Lydia Hall, Tiffany Joh, Haeji Kang, Frida Kinhult (a), Brittany Marchand, Inci Mehmet, Hollie Muse (a), Robynn Ree, Pannarat Thanapolboonyaras, Sideri Vanova, Ursula Wikström

Nationalities in the field

Past champions in the field

Made the cut

Missed the cut

Round summaries

First round
Thursday, 2 August 2018

Minjee Lee shot a 7-under-par 65 to lead by one stroke over Mamiko Higa. Defending champion In-Kyung Kim shot a 1-under-par 71.

Second round
Friday, 3 August 2018

Third round
Saturday, 4 August 2018

Final round
Sunday, 5 August 2018

Scorecard
Final round

Cumulative tournament scores, relative to par
{|class="wikitable" span = 50 style="font-size:85%;
|-
|style="background: Pink;" width=10|
|Birdie
|style="background: PaleGreen;" width=10|
|Bogey
|style="background: Green;" width=10|
|Double bogey
|style="background: Olive;" width=10|
|Triple bogey+
|}
Source:

References

External links

Coverage on the LPGA Tour site
Coverage on the Ladies European Tour

Women's British Open
Golf tournaments in England
British Open
Women's British Open
Women's British Open